

Classification 

The winning roster of OKK Beograd:
  Ljubomir Lucić
  Miodrag Nikolić
  Slobodan Gordić
  Radivoj Korać
  Slobodan Nešić
  Miodrag Popović
  Đorđe Otašević
  Bogomir Rajković
  Vojislav Jovanović
  Milorad Erkić
  Marko Marković

Coach:  Borislav Stanković

Scoring leaders
 Radivoj Korać (OKK Beograd) – ___ points (35.2 ppg)
 ???
 ???

Qualification in 1958-59 season European competitions 

FIBA European Champions Cup
 OKK Beograd (champions)

References

Yugoslav First Basketball League seasons